Goran Todorčev (born 21 January 1984 in Negotino) is a Macedonian retired football player.

Club career
He rejoined Rabotnički after playing for the Croatian club Inter Zaprešić.

International career
Todorčev was called up to the Macedonian national team for the first time for a friendly against Albania on 17 November 2010 but he was forced to withdraw because of an injury.

External links
Profile at Nogometni magazin 
Profile at Sportnet.hr 

1984 births
Living people
People from Negotino
Association football midfielders
Macedonian footballers
FK Rabotnički players
NK Osijek players
NK Inter Zaprešić players
FK Teteks players
Macedonian First Football League players
Croatian Football League players
Macedonian expatriate footballers
Expatriate footballers in Croatia
Macedonian expatriate sportspeople in Croatia